Lee Hyun-woo may refer to:

 Lee Hyun-woo (entertainer, born 1966), South Korean actor and singer
 Lee Hyun-woo (actor, born 1993), South Korean actor and singer